Code page 1018 (CCSID 1018), also known as CP1018, is IBM's code page for the Swedish and Finnish version of ISO 646 (ISO-646-FI / ISO-646-SE / IR-10), specified in SFS 4017 and SEN 850200 Annex B, SIS 63 61 27.

Code page layout

See also
Code page 1103 (similar DEC NRCS code page)
Code page 1106 (similar DEC NRCS code page)

References

1018